Uppsala Municipality (Uppsala kommun) is a municipality in Uppsala County in east central Sweden. Uppsala has a population of 211,411 (2016-06-30). Its seat is located in the university city of Uppsala.

Uppsala Municipality was created through amalgamations taking place during the late sixties and the early seventies. There are about thirty original local government units combined in the present municipality. A split took place in 2003, when Knivsta Municipality was formed.

Towns and villages  
By population:

 Uppsala (seat) 
 Sävja 
 Storvreta 
 Björklinge 
 Bälinge 
 Vattholma 
 Vänge 
 Lövstalöt 
 Almunge 
 Länna 
 Skyttorp 
 Ytternäs och Vreta 
 Knutby 
 Gåvsta 
 Järlåsa 
 Gunsta 
 Skölsta 
 Ramstalund 
 Håga 
 Vårdsätra 
 Skoby 
 Läby 
 Blackstalund

Economy 
Largest operating companies in Uppsala:
 Erasteel, metallurgy
 Cytiva, biotechnology
 Upplands Motor, car dealership
 Beijer Alma, technology
 Fresenius Kabi, healthcare
 Thermo Scientific, pharmaceutical company
 Uppsala Kommun, county admin
 Stora Enso, renewables
 Biotage, healthcare
 Galderma, healthcare

Government and politics  
Historically, Uppsala Municipality has been a centre both of conservatism and liberalism, both receiving their ideological nourishment from the university. Today, however, the city is divided between left and right and has since 1994 been governed by a coalition of the Social Democrats, the Left Party and the Green Party until the 2006 elections where the centre-right coalition Alliance for Sweden won not only the national elections but also the regional.

Distribution of the 81 seats in the municipal council after the 2010 election:

Moderate Party   23
Social Democratic Party   21
Green Party   11
Liberal People's Party   8
Centre Party   6
Left Party   6
Christian Democrats   4
Sweden Democrats   2

Results of the 2010 Swedish general election in Uppsala:

Moderate Party   29.5%
Social Democratic Party   24.0%
Green Party   11.2%
Liberal People's Party   9.1%
Centre Party   7.6%
Christian Democrats   6.4%
Left Party   6.4%
Sweden Democrats   3.8%

International relations

Twin towns — sister cities
The municipality has the following twinnings
  Bærum
  Frederiksberg
  Hafnarfjörður
  Hämeenlinna
  Tartu
  Minneapolis
  Daejeon

References

External links 

 Uppsala Municipality - Official site

 

 
Uppsala
Municipalities of Uppsala County